Achepabanca Lake is a freshwater body crossed by the Achepabanca River, in the north-eastern part of Senneterre, within La Vallée-de-l'Or Regional County Municipality (RCM), in the administrative region of Abitibi-Témiscamingue, in the province of Quebec, in Canada.

Lake Achepabanca is located entirely in the township of Maricourt. Forestry is the main economic activity of the sector. Recreational tourism activities come second. Achepabanca Lake is the eastern boundary of the Wetetnagami Lake Biodiversity Reserve.

The hydrographic slope of Achepabanca Lake is accessible via a forest road (east-west) that passes on the north side of Achepabanca Lake, passing through the Lake Wetetnagami Biodiversity Reserve; in addition, another forest road (East-West direction) serves the southern part of this Reserve and the western side of Lake Achepabanca.

The surface of Achepabanca Lake is usually frozen from early November to mid-May, however, safe ice circulation is generally from mid-November to mid-April.

Geography

Toponymy
The Achepabanca Lake Acme is linked to the Achepabanca River and the Achepabanca Northeast River.

The toponym "lac Achepabanca" was formalized on December 5, 1968, by the Commission de toponymie du Québec, when it was created.

Notes and references

See also 

Lakes of Abitibi-Témiscamingue
Nottaway River drainage basin